The 2016 PSA Men's World Squash Championship is the men's edition of the 2016 World Championship, which serves as the individual world championship for squash players. The event took place in Cairo, Egypt from 27 October to 6 November 2016. Karim Abdel Gawad won his first World Championship title, defeating Ramy Ashour in the final.

Prize money and ranking points
For 2016, the prize purse was $325,000. The prize money and points breakdown is as follows:

Seeds

Draw and results

Finals

Top half

Section 1

Section 2

Bottom half

Section 1

Section 2

See also
World Championship
2016 Women's World Open Squash Championship

References

External links
PSA World Championship page

World Squash Championships
M
Squash tournaments in Egypt
International sports competitions hosted by Egypt
2016 in Egyptian sport
Sports competitions in Cairo